Henotiderus is a genus of silken fungus beetles in the family Cryptophagidae. There are at least four described species in Henotiderus.

Species
These four species belong to the genus Henotiderus:
 Henotiderus centromaculatus Reitter, 1877
 Henotiderus hirtus (Casey, 1900)
 Henotiderus lorna (Hatch, 1962)
 Henotiderus obesulus (Casey, 1900)

References

Further reading

 
 
 

Cryptophagidae
Articles created by Qbugbot